Susanne "Susy" Augustesen (born 10 May 1956) is a Danish former international footballer who played club football for many years in Italy.

Club career
In a professional career spanning some 20 years, Augustesen scored over 600 goals in Italy's top flight. She was the Serie A top goalscorer on eight occasions.

International career
In September 1971, 15-year-old Augustesen scored a hat-trick for Denmark in the final of an unofficial World Cup. The Danes beat hosts Mexico 3–0 before 110,000 spectators at the Estadio Azteca in Mexico City. Augustesen, who had needed her parents' permission to attend the tournament, scored all three goals with her left foot.

The Danish Football Association (DBU) took over the running of women's football and launched an official national team in 1972. There remained some ambivalence and matches arranged were sporadic. Despite a highly successful professional career in Italy, Augustesen was never called–up to the DBU team.

References

Danish women's footballers
Denmark women's international footballers
1958 births
Living people
People from Holbæk Municipality
Danish expatriate sportspeople in Italy
Expatriate women's footballers in Italy
Serie A (women's football) players
S.S. Lazio Women 2015 players
A.C.F. Trani 80 players
Women's association football forwards
Danish expatriate women's footballers
Sportspeople from Region Zealand
C.F. Euromobil Modena players